James N. Loughran, S.J., Ph.D. (March 22, 1940 – December 24, 2006) was an American Jesuit who served as the 12th president of Loyola Marymount University and 21st president of Saint Peter's College.

Biography

Early life
Loughran was born in Brooklyn, New York on March 22, 1940. He graduated from Brooklyn Prep in 1957 and entered the Society of Jesus in July 1958. Loughran attended the College of the Holy Cross and graduated from Fordham University, earning a Bachelor's degree in History, summa cum laude, in 1964. He also earned a Master's degree and a Doctorate in Philosophy from Fordham University and studied Theology in France and at Woodstock College in New York. He was ordained on June 11, 1970 and took his final vows on December 8, 1978.

Academic career
While president of LMU, Loughran directed considerable financial resources to academics and lowered the minimum course load for professors from four to three, freeing up faculty for research and other scholarly and creative pursuits. He established classes in the study of American cultures, in part to raise awareness of the school's minority students who were pushing for greater recognition. He was president in 1990 when one of Loyola Marymount's top basketball players, Hank Gathers, collapsed during a game and died. Gathers' family brought a wrongful-death suit against Loyola Marymount that the school settled for $545,000. Loughran raised the university's endowment from about $21 million to $106 million before he resigned unexpectedly in 1991.

In February 1990, Loughran denied university recognition to a fledgling gay and lesbian student organization, the Alliance of Gays and Lesbians - Loyola Marymount University (AGL-LMU), despite the group's support from both the student and faculty senates and in disregard of the fact that its charter did not violate Catholic teachings. At the time of Loughran's decision, there was already a formally recognized gay and lesbian student group at Loyola Law School, which is part of Loyola Marymount University, though on a separate campus. Loughran's actions set off a contentious debate among students, faculty and staff. The organization struggled after its founding president graduated, though it survives in some form as of 2011.

In addition to his leadership positions at LMU and St Peter's, Loughran served as acting president of Brooklyn College in 1992, interim president of Mount St. Mary's College in Emmittsburg, Maryland, from 1993–94 and dean of Fordham College in New York. Fr. Loughran was an Associate Professor of Philosophy at Fordham from 1974–1984 and held the Edmund Miller, S.J., Philosophy Professorship at John Carroll University in Cleveland, Ohio from 1992-1993. Prior to returning to Saint Peter's as President, Loughran was Interim Vice President for Academic Affairs and Interim Dean of the Arts and Sciences faculty at Fordham.

References

External links
 http://articles.latimes.com/2006/dec/28/local/me-loughran28
 https://query.nytimes.com/gst/fullpage.html?res=9902E1D7113AF934A15751C1A9609C8B63
 http://www.ajcunet.edu/Rev.-James-N.-Loughran,-S.J.-%281940-2006%29,-President-of-Saint-Peter%27s-College,-Dies
 https://web.archive.org/web/20120307151922/http://www.lmu.edu/lmunews/LMU_Mourns_the_Death_of_Past_President_James_N__Loughran__S_J_.htm?DateTime=633029338800000000&PageMode=View
 http://articles.latimes.com/1990-02-11/local/me-1125_1_gay-groups
 http://articles.latimes.com/1990-02-16/local/me-762_1_loyola-marymount-president
 http://articles.latimes.com/1990-02-22/local/me-1399_1_loyola-marymount-university
 http://articles.latimes.com/1990-04-20/local/me-1270_1_loyola-marymount

20th-century American Jesuits
21st-century American Jesuits
1940 births
2006 deaths
Presidents of Loyola Marymount University
Presidents of Saint Peter's University
Mount St. Mary's University (Los Angeles) people
Brooklyn Preparatory School alumni
Brooklyn College faculty
20th-century American academics